Irfan Khoosat (Punjabi) (born 9 June 1946) is a Pakistani actor, producer and a well-known comedian. He is famous for his comic role as Hawaldar Karamdad in the TV series Andhera Ujala 
(1984-1985) in which he portrayed a simpleton and a blabbermouth character of a low-ranked policeman.

He is also well-known as a stage comedian. He won a Nigar Award for his comic role in the 1985 film Hum Se Hai Zamana.

He also has done leading role in the movie named Direct Hawaldar (1985 film).

Personal life 
Irfan Khoosat was born in Okara, Punjab. He is the father of a notable film and TV director and actor Sarmad Sultan Khoosat.

He is the son of famous comedian late Sultan Khoosat – 1950s radio and film comedian and artist. He has been married 3 times and has 9 children.

Filmography

Films

Television

Producer 
 Aao Kahani Buntay Hain - TV 2011
 Piya Naam Ka Diya - TV 2007
 Shashlik Xtra Hott
 Kalmoohi
 Mujhe Apna Naam O Nishan Mile

References

External links 
 
 Irfan Khoosat profile on the TV.com.pk website

1946 births
Living people
People from Okara, Pakistan
Pakistani male comedians
Pakistani television producers
Pakistani male film actors
Punjabi people
Nigar Award winners
Male actors in Urdu cinema